The Antonov An-26 (NATO reporting name: Curl) is a twin-engined turboprop civilian and military transport aircraft, designed and produced in the Soviet Union from 1969 to 1986.

Development
While the An-24T tactical transport had proved successful in supporting Soviet troops in austere locations, its ventral loading hatch restricted the handling of cargo, and in particular vehicles, and made it less effective than hoped in parachuting men and supplies. As a result, interest in a version with a retractable cargo ramp increased, and the Antonov design bureau decided in 1966 to begin development on the new An-26 derivative, in advance of an official order. The cargo ramp was based on that design and allowed the cargo deck to be sealed and pressurised in flight. When loading cargo, it could either be lowered to allow vehicles to be driven in, or slid beneath the aircraft's fuselage, so that cargo could be loaded straight in off a truck bed. In March 1968, the OKB received official permission to begin development. Particular attention was given to the military mission, and the majority of early An-26 production was delivered to the VTA (voyenno-transportnaya aviatsiya).

Using the majority of the An-24 airframe, it has high-set cantilevered wings, wing-mounted twin turboprops with a turbojet engine in the starboard nacelle for use as an auxiliary power unit and also for extra take-off thrust, plus long main undercarriage legs. The An-26 includes military equipment, such as tip-up paratroop canvas seats, an overhead traveling hoist, bulged observation windows and parachute static line attachment cables. It can be configured in 20-30 minutes from the troop transport or freight mission to the medical evacuation role with up to 24 stretchers fitted.

The An-26 made its public debut at the 27th Paris Air Show at Le Bourget where the second prototype, CCCP-26184 (c/n00202), was shown in the static aircraft park.

The An-26 is also manufactured without a license agreement in China by the Xian Aircraft factory as the Y-14, later changed to be included in the Xian Y7 series.

Total production

Operational history
The An-26 has a secondary bomber role with underwing bomb racks. The racks are attached to the fuselage in front of and behind the rear landing gear. In the bombing role it was extensively used by the Vietnam People's Air Force during the Cambodian–Vietnamese War and Sudanese Air Force during the Second Sudanese Civil War and the War in Darfur. Russian Forces have also trained with the An-26 as a bomber.

One An-26 was involved in the Purulia Incident in 1995 in which arms were dropped in the Purulia district of West Bengal, India. The reason behind the drop is not disclosed to the public due to national security.

Variants

An-26
"Curl-A" : Twin-engine tactical transport aircraft.
An-26-100
Convertible passenger/cargo aircraft modified from An-26 aircraft at the Kyiv plant from 1999.
An-26 Nel'mo
An arctic surveillance and reconnaissance aircraft retrofitted with Nel'mo equipment.
An-26 Pogoda
(Weather) Another aircraft for weather control duties, similar to the An-26 Tsiklon, with a simplified equipment test lab.
An-26 Polyot
(Flight) A single aircraft retrofitted for the purpose of research of unified air traffic control and monitoring system throughout the USSR, with a comprehensive navigation test lab including precision compasses and Doppler speed/shift sensors.
An-26 Sfera
(Sphere) A single production aircraft built as a laboratory for atmospheric research.
An-26 Shtabnoy
(Shtab: or Headquarters) some An-26s delivered to the Soviet and DDR air forces for use as staff transports/mobile command posts.

(Life) A single mobile operating room, surgery and intensive care unit ('25 Blue', c/n5406), for the Ukrainian Air Force.
An-26A
A one-off assault transport prototype with higher performance due to removal of some military equipment.
An-26ASLK
(Avtomatizirovannaya sistema lyotnogo kontrolya – automated flight control and monitoring system) : A modern flight control and monitoring system equipped with automatic calibration and navigation systems. Recognizable by the distinctive pod low on the forward fuselage side.
An-26B
A civil cargo version equipped with roller gangsways which can be swung up against the cabin walls when not in use. It was also equipped with two ZMDB Progress (Ivchyenko) Al-24VT turboprop powerplants to deliver higher thrust.
An-26B
The prototype An-26B retrofitted as a mobile civilian emergency hospital.
An-26B Tsiklon
(Cyclone) A weather research/control and cloud-seeding aircraft for the Central Aerologic Laboratory. This aircraft was used for rain induction and protection using cloud-seeding chemicals dropped from slab-sided pods hung from pylons.
An-26B-100
Convertible passenger/cargo aircraft modified from An-26B aircraft at the Kyiv plant from 1999.
An-26BL
Alternative designation for the An-26L.
An-26BRL
Alternative designation of the An-26RL Arctic surveillance and reconnaissance aircraft.
An-26D
(Dal'niy – long-range) An extended range version with extra fuel in wing tanks and additional external tanks attached to the airframe of the fuselage. One aircraft ('21 Yellow', c/n 13806) was retrofitted and delivered, but no further orders were forthcoming.
An-26K Kaira
(Great Auk) A single An-26 aircraft converted to a Kaira test airframe for the development of airborne Laser guided systems.
An-26K Kaplya
(Drop [of liquid]) After completion of the laser designator trials the An-26K Kaira was retrofitted to search or optically guided weapons as the navigation systems. During a night test flight at low level, in March 1989, the An-26K Kaplya suffered a massive bird strike, which consequently destroyed the windshield and injured the pilot, who involuntarily downed the aircraft into the Azov Sea.
An-26KPA
(Kontrol'no-Poverochnaya Apparatura – Testing and calibration equipment) : A navigation aids inspecting aircraft with comprehensive navigation equipment and calibration equipment.
An-26L
A single An-26, (14 Orange, c/n 00607), used at Sperenberg Airfield near Berlin, for airfield and NAVAID calibration.
An-26LL-PLO
(Letayuschaya Laboratoriya – Protivolodochnoy Oborony – ASW (Anti-Submarine Warfare) testbed) : A single An-26A aircraft, (c/n 0901), retrofitted and modified to accommodate range of sophisticated laboratory for surveillance systems, detecting and tracking stealthy nuclear submarines.
An-26LP
Firefighting version. At least 9 converted.
An-26M Spasatel
(Rescue worker) Flying hospital with an emergency surgery facility. Two converted.
An-26P
(Protivopozharnyy – firefighting) : Aircraft fire-bomber, retrofitted with water tanks in pods on either side of the lower fuselage, which could be substituted for dispensers for silver iodide flares for rainmaking. At least 5 converted.
An-26P Prozhektor
(Projector or Searchlight) A single conversion of an An-26 as a guided missile system airframe.
An-26REP
(Rahdioelektronnoye protivodeystviye – ECM (Electronic Counter-Measures) ) : Electronic countermeasures aircraft fitted with active jammers in cylindrical pods on either side of the lower fuselage sides, as well as chaff and I/R flares for self-defense. One built but did not enter service.
An-26RL
(Razvedchik Ledovyy – An arctic surveillance, reconnaissance and monitoring) : An arctic surveillance, reconnaissance and monitoring aircraft used to monitor the icebergs and ice formations at arctic circle fitted with SLAR (Sideways Looking Airborne Radar) in long pods on either side of the lower fuselage, extra fuel in a cargo hold fuel tank, provision for surveyors and radar operators.
An-26RR
Alternative unit designation of the An-26RT ELINT(ELectronic INTelligence) aircraft.
An-26RT
"Curl-B": (First use of the designation) A basic designation for a series of ELINT aircraft fitted with a wide range of electromagnetic surveillance equipment. At least one aircraft, (tactical code '152'), retrofitted with the Tarahn (Ramming Attack) ELINT suite for use in Afghanistan.
An-26RT
(Retranslyator – Interpreter -Translator): (Substitute of designation) Battlefield communications relay aircraft, fitted with powerful Inzheer (Fig) radio relay system, for connecting forward units to headquarters units. 42 built.
An-26RTR
Alternative unit designation of the An-26RT ELINT aircraft.
An-26S
(Salon – [VIP] Lounge) : A new VIP Lounge aircraft for the Ukrainian Ministry of Defense delivered about 1997.
An-26Sh
(Shturmanskiy – Navigator) : Navigator trainer for the VVS, 36 built at Kyiv.

Non-USSR /-Ukrainian versions

An-26SM
One aircraft modified as an ELINT aircraft for the East German Air Force.
An-26M
One aircraft modified for NAVAID calibration and flight monitoring for the East German Air Force and transferred to the post-unification German Air Force.
An-26ST
East German designation for An-26s used as staff transports.
An-26T
Unofficial East German designation for An-26s operated by Transportfliegerstaffel 24 (transport squadron 24).
An-26Z-1
Czechoslovakian ELINT conversion of one aircraft for ELINT duties.
Xian Y-7H
Military transport version. Chinese production version.
Xian Y-14
Initial designation of the An-26 copy, later changed to 'Y-7H' (Hao – cargo).

Operators

Military operators

 National Air Force of Angola – 22 An-26s bought between 1976 and 1987. One aircraft still operational as of December 2021.

 Belarusian Air Force – three operated December 2016.

 Cape Verde Army – 3

 Chad Air Force – three in service December 2016.

 23 Xian Y-7; 4 Xian Y-7-100; includes all types of Y-7 aircraft
 People's Liberation Army Air Force
 People's Liberation Army Navy

 Cuban Air Force – operated 17, two in service December 2016.

 Democratic Republic of the Congo Air Force – three in service as of 2021.

 Ethiopian Air Force – one

 Ivory Coast Air Force – two in service as of 2021.

 Kazakh Air Force – five An-24 or An-26 in service December 2015.; Received one refurbished An-26 from Ukraine on 3 November 2017.

 Kyrgyz Air Force – two donated from Russia in August 2017.

 Lao People's Liberation Army Air Force – one in service December 2016.

 Libyan Air Force – two An-24/An-26 as of December 2016.

 Malagasy Air Force – one

 Moldovan Air Force – one as of December 2016.

 Mozambique Air Force – one as of December 2016.

 Namibian Air Force – one as of December 2016.

 Nicaraguan Air Force – four as of February 2018.

 Puntland Maritime Police Force – one

 Romanian Air Force – Two as 2021 will be withdrawn after 2023 of Alenia C-27J Spartan

 Russian Air Force – 104 as of December 2016.
 Russian Naval Aviation
 Border Guard Service of Russia

 Serbian Air Force – one 

 Sudanese Air Force – six as of December 2016; at least one has been used as an improvised bomber

 Syrian Air Force – two as of December 2016; one crashed

Armed Forces of Transnistria

 Ukrainian Naval Aviation – two as of December 2016
 Ukrainian Air Force – around 22 as of 2017

 Uzbek Air Force – four as of December 2016

 Yemen Air Force – six

Former military operators

 Afghan Air Force – All remaining aircraft retired June 2011. One of their An-26 which defected to Pakistan, is preserved at PAF Museum, Karachi

 Bangladesh Air Force

 Benin Air Force – two

 Bulgarian Air Force – five used from 1984 until 2011

 Royal Cambodian Air Force

 Congolese Air Force – one

 Czechoslovakian Air Force

 East German Air Force

 German Air Force

Guinea-Bissau Air Force

 Hungarian Air Force – 11 delivered from 1974, last one retired June 2020.

 Iraqi Air Force

 Lithuanian Air Force – three operated

 Malagasy Air Force - two delivered in 1980

 Malian Air Force - one

 Mongolian Air Defense Forces Command – four

 Niger Air Force – one, bought from Libya in 1997

 Yemen Arab Republic Air Force - one

 Pakistani Air Force

 Peruvian Air Force – 22 operated from 1977 to 1993

 Polish Air Force – 12 operated from 1972 to January 2009; retired

 Slovak Air Force – Two, retired in 2016, to be replaced by Alenia C-27J Spartan aircraft beginning in 2017.

 Somali Air Corps

 People's Democratic Republic of Yemen Air Force - three bought in 1979

 Soviet Air Force – Passed on to successor states in 1991
 Soviet Naval Aviation –

 Tanzanian Air Force – none; retired

 Military of Turkmenistan – ten

 United States Air Force – Operated 2003–2007 by the 6th Special Operations Squadron

 Vietnam People's Air Force

 Yugoslav Air Force – 14

 Zambian Air Force and Air Defense Command – four

Civil operators

 Genex (two)

 Air Bright (one)

 Sadelca (one)
 Servicio Aéreo del Vaupés SELVA (three)

 Aerogaviota (three)

 SAS Cargo Group (one)

 CityLine Hungary (four)

 RAF-Avia (five)

 Valan International Cargo Charter

 Aero Condor (one)
 Amazon Sky (two)
 ATSA (one)
 Cielos Andinos (two)

 Interisland Airlines
 Mosphil Aero

 Exin (six)

 Angara Airlines (three)
 Chukotavia (three)
 IrAero (ten)
 Khabarovsk Airlines (three)
 Kostroma Air Enterprise (four)
 KrasAvia (four)
 Polar Airlines (three)

 Badr Airlines (one)

 Tajik Air (one)

 Air Urga (ten)
 Antonov Airlines (former)
 ARP 410 Airlines (five)
 Constanta Airline (four)
 Eleron Airlines (two)
 Vulkan Air (three)

 Solar Cargo (two)

*note: Lithuania was not a CIS country.

Accidents and incidents

1970s
 23 May 1976: An Aeroflot An-26 (CCCP-26567) crashed short of the runway near Teply Klyuch Airport, Russia.
 14 July 1977: An National Air Force of Angola An-26 was shot down by UNITA rebels near Cuangar, killing 30 people on board.
 18 August 1977: An Aeroflot An-26 (CCCP-26536) landed hard at Ust-Kuyga Airport due to pilot error; no casualties.
 9 December 1978: An Aeroflot An-26 (CCCP-26547) lost control and crashed shortly after takeoff from Cherskiy Airport due to a shifted load, killing all seven on board. The cargo had not been secured properly.
 26 March 1979: Aeroflot Flight 37293, an An-26 (CCCP-26569), struck a wooded hillside near Baykit, Russia, killing four of 12 on board.

1980s
 12 December 1980: A Soviet Air Forces An-26 was shot down by guerrilla forces in Angola near the border with Namibia, killing five people on board.
 23 December 1981: Aeroflot Flight 22237, an An-26 (CCCP-26505), crashed while on approach to Severo-Yeniseisk Airport in poor weather during an attempted go-around after descending too soon, killing two of seven on board. The flight mechanic and navigator were drunk.
 14 January 1982: An Ethiopian Air Force An-26 crashed near Addis Ababa, killing 73 Ethiopian, Libyan and Cuban troops. This accident remains the deadliest involving the An-26.
 11 February 1982: Vietnam People's Air Force An-26 26264 was shot down by two Royal Thai Air Force Northrop F-5Es and crashed in a rice field near Prachinburi, Thailand, during an intelligence-gathering mission from Phnom Penh, reportedly killing one of 13 on board.
 15 March 1982: A Soviet Navy An-26 (MSN 6805) crashed shortly after a night-time take off from Anapa Airport when the flaps were retracted prematurely, killing all nine people on board.
 29 November 1982: a TAAG Angola Airlines An-26 (D2-TAB) flew into a mountain in the Bibala region, killing all 15 people on board.
 23 December 1982: An Aeroflot An-26 (CCCP-26627) crashed on takeoff from Rostov Airport, killing all 16 on board. The aircraft was overloaded.
 6 May 1983: a Soviet Air Forces An-26 hit trees on a night-time approach in heavy snow as it was trying to land at Klyuchi, Klyuchevsky District, Altai Krai, killing 33 of the 37 people on board.
 3 July 1984: A Peruvian Air Force An-26 (FAP-377) crashed into mountains northeast of Lima, killing all five people on board.
 22 January 1985: a Soviet Air Forces An-26 operating in Afghanistan exceeded the maximum allowable speed and broke apart, killing all eight people on board.
 3 May 1985: Soviet Air Force An-26 101 red (callsign "CCCP-26492") collided in mid-air with Aeroflot Flight 8381, a Tupolev Tu-134, due to ATC errors, killing all 94 on board both aircraft.
 4 September 1985: A Bakhtar Afghan Airlines An-26 (YA-BAM) was shot down by a SAM near Kandahar, killing all 52 people on board.
 30 March 1986: A Mozambique Air Force An-26 crashed while trying to land at Pemba Airport. All three crew and 41 of the 46 passengers were killed.
 6 December 1986: a Hungarian Air Force An-26 (MSN 2210) crashed after take-off from Budapest-Ferihegy Airport, most likely because of icing. Four of the five people on board were killed.
 9 February 1987: an Afghan Air Force An-26 was shot down by Mujahideen guerrillas shortly after takeoff from Kabul International Airport, killing all 36 people on board.
 19 February 1987: a Soviet Air Forces An-26 crashed in fog near Stadnitsa while attempting to land at Vinnytsia, killing all nine people on board.
 6 March 1987: an Aeroflot An-26 (CCCP-26007) struck a mountain near Almaty after failing to change heading, killing all nine people on board.
 11 June 1987: a Bakhtar Afghan Airlines An-25 (YA-BAL) was shot down by rebels near Khost, killing 53 of the 55 people on board.
 18 June 1987: a Peruvian Air Force An-26 (FAP-392) crashed into a mountain near Saposoa, killing all 46 people on board.
 13 August 1987: an Afghan Air Force An-26 was reportedly shot down, killing all 12 on board.
 1 September 1987: an Afghan Air Force An-26 was shot down near Khost, killing all right people on board.
 13 September 1987: a Soviet Air Forces An-26 was shot down by Afghanistan rebels near Kunduz, killing all 15 people on board.
 16 September 1987: Vietnam People's Air Force An-26 285 flying from Hanoi to Ho Chi Minh City crashed at Bảo Lộc while on approach to Ho Chi Minh City, killing all 31 crew and passengers on board, mostly military personnel and their family members. Wreckage was found in 1989.
 22 October 1987: a Soviet Air Forces An-26 was shot down near Jalalabad Airport, killing all eight people on board.
 21 December 1987: A Soviet Air Force An-26 flying from Kabul to Bagram was shot down by a Stinger missile shortly after takeoff. The no. 1 engine was hit and shrapnel punctured the fuel tank. Smoke entered the cabin. Five of the six crew members bailed out safely, however the pilot jumped out at an altitude too low to open the parachute and did not survive.
 10 April 1988: an Afghan Air Force An-26 was shot down near Maymana, killing all 29 people on board.
 20 April 1988: a Soviet Air Forces An-26 (MSN 11808) crashed shortly after takeoff from Chkalovsky Air Base when the right engine failed, killing all six people on board.
 27 April 1988: a Cuban Air Force An-26 T-237 was accidentally shot down by Cuban troops stationed at Techamutete, Angola, killing all 29 people on board.
 24 June 1988: a Soviet Air Forces An-26 was shot down by Mujahideen rebels after take off from Kabul International Airport, killing all five people on board.
 19 November 1988: an Afghan Air Force An-26 was shot down by the Pakistan Air Force near Parachinar, killing all 30 people on board. Afghan officials said the plane had crossed the border after suffering mechanical problems while Pakistani officials said it had failed to identify itself.
 10 December 1988: an Ariana Afghan Airlines An-26 was shot down over Pakistan by the Pakistan Air Force, killing all 25 people on board.
 10 March 1989: an National Air Force of Angola An-26 crashed at Cazombo, killing all five people on board.
 18 June 1989: an Ariana Afghan Airlines An-26 (YA-BAK) crash landed on a hill near Zabol after the ramp was opened in flight, killing six of the 39 people on board.
 19 July 1989: an Aeroflot An-26 (CCCP-26685) was on an ice observation flight over the East Siberian Sea to guide ships when it crashed at Cape Kibera after the left wing hit a cliff during a turn that was too close to the shore, killing all 10 on board.
 23 July 1989: an National Air Force of Angola An-26 was shot down by UNITA rebels near Chana, killing 42 of the 48 people on board.
 8 September 1989: a Cuban Air and Air Defense Force An-26 (MSN 3805) crashed into the sea near Playa de Baracoa during a nighttime exercise, killing seven of the eight people on board. 
 26 October 1989: a Soviet Air Forces An-26 flew into a mountain in bad weather near Petropavlovsk-Kamchatsky, killing all 37 people on board.

1990s
 1990s: Soviet Air Force An-26 01 red burned out on the ground at Orenburg Air Base following an APU fire.
 mid 1990s: Russian Air Force An-26 RA-47415 force-landed at Belgorod Airport and was withdrawn from use and cancelled from the Russian register in 2001. Although the aircraft was planned to become a cinema for the "Rolan Bykov Fund" in Belgorod, this was abandoned in 2004 because some of the radioactive sensors had not been removed.
 23 March 1990: Cubana de Aviacion Flight 7406, an An-26 (CU-T1436), overran the runway at Antonio Maceo Airport following an aborted takeoff, killing four of 46 on board.
 5 May 1990: a Soviet Air Forces An-26 crashed near Sparfayev island while on a flight from Magadan, killing all seven people on board.
 22 February 1991: an National Air Force of Angola An-26 was shot down near Cazombo Airport, killing all 47 people on board.
 15 August 1991: due to an air traffic controller's mistaken direction a Soviet Air Forces An-26 hit a mountain after take-off from Burevestnik Airport, killing all nine people on board. 
 27 February 1992: German Air Force An-26 "52+10" crashed after a hard landing. None of the crew members was injured.
 8 April 1992: Yasir Arafat's An-26 crashed during a sandstorm. Of the 13 on board, both pilots and an engineer were killed.
 23 April 1993: A MIAT Mongolian Airlines An-26 (BNMAU-14102) struck the side of Marz Mountain, Zavkhan Province, Mongolia while descending for Ölgii, killing all 32 on board.
 17 June 1993: A Tajikistan Airlines An-26 (26035) stalled, spun down and crashed into a hillside 22 mi north of Tbilisi, Georgia, after encountering severe turbulence, killing all 33 on board.
 26 December 1993: A Kuban Airlines An-26 (RA-26141) stalled and crashed upside down while landing at Leninakan Airport due to overloading, killing 35 of 36 on board.
 13 July 1994: A Russian Air Force An-26 was stolen from Kubinka AFB by an engineer planning to commit suicide. He circled Lyakhovo at 300–2000 feet until the aircraft ran out of fuel and crashed, killing him.
 31 July 1994: An Air Ukraine An-26B (UR-26207), operating on behalf of the UN, was reportedly shot down and crashed near Saborsko, Croatia, killing all 7 people on board.
 16 January 1995: An Angolan Air Force An-26 was downed by rebel forces in the north of the country, killing all six occupants.
 16 March 1995: A Central Region Airlines An-26B (RA-26084) struck a hill and crashed near Ossora Airport while on approach due to crew errors, killing nine of 10 on board.
 31 August 1995: a Malian Air Force An-26 (TZ-347) flew into a mountain near Thessaloniki Airport in bad weather, killing all six people on board.
 17 December 1995: Terrorist Kim Davy alias Niels Holck from Denmark dropped several tonnes of lethal weapons, ammunition, explosives and triggers by An-26 in Purulia district of West Bengal State of India. The plane was forced to land in Bombay, where his accomplices were arrested.
 1997: Sudan Air Force An-26 7711 force-landed at Gogrial Airport after it was struck by SPLA ground fire.
 2 September 1998: A Permtransavia An-26 (RA-20628) operating for Prestavia, crashed near Malanje Airport, Angola, after the pilot reported an engine fire, killing all 24 on board; the wreckage was found in 2003. Some reports stated that the aircraft was shot down by UNITA forces.
 21 January 1999: Nicaraguan Air Force An-26 152 crashed after getting too low on approach and striking a tree near Bluefields Airport, killing all 28 people on board.

2000s
 30 March 2000: an An-26 chartered from Ukrainian company Avialinii AAR crashed near Anuradhapura Airport while carrying Sri Lanka Army troops, killing all 40 on board. The cause of the accident is unclear.
 12 August 2000: a STAER airlines An-26 crashed near Tshikapa while trying to return to Kinshasa Airport, killing all 27 on board.
 31 October 2000: an ACA-Ancargo An-26 (D2-FDI) crashed 20 minutes after take-off from Saurimo Airport, killing all 49 people on board. UNITA rebels say they shot it down.
 4 April 2001: a Sudanese Air Force An-26 crashed on take-off in a sandstorm from Adar Yel, killing the deputy defence minister and 13 high-ranking officers. Another 16 passengers survived.
 21 February 2002: a Russian Navy An-26 crashed after striking treetops while on final approach to Lakhta air base, killing 17 of the 20 people on board.
 29 November 2003: a Congolese Air Force An-26 9T-TAD crashed during takeoff due to a burst tyre, killing 20 of the 24 people on board and 13 people on the ground.
 5 May 2005: a chartered Aeroworld An-26 (EK-26060) crashed shortly after take-off from Kisangani Bangoka International Airport, killing 10 of the 11 people on board.
 9 August 2005: a Yemeni Air Force An-26 crashed in Mukalla, killing one of its occupants and injuring 22 others.
 5 September 2005: A Kavatshi Airlines An-26B (ER-AZT) operating on a non-scheduled passenger flight struck a tree and crashed on approach to Isiro Airport in Matari, killing all 11 people on board.
 9 September 2005: An Air Kasai An-26B (9Q-CFD) operating on a non-scheduled passenger flight crashed 50 km (31 miles) north of Brazzaville, killing all 13 people on board.
 11 February 2006: a Sudanese Air Force An-26 crashed into a building upon landing at Aweil, South Sudan after the front tyre burst, killing all 20 people on board.
 9 January 2007: An AerianTur-M Antonov An-26 (ER-26068) crashed while attempting to land at the U.S. military base in Balad, Iraq, killing 34 of 35 on board. Although the aircraft crashed due to fog, some eyewitness and sources state that the aircraft was shot down by a missile.
 4 October 2007: An Africa One An-26 (9Q-COS) crashed into the Kinshasa neighbourhood of Kimbaseke just after takeoff. 21 out of 22 people on board and 28 people on the ground died. Initial reports indicate a lost propeller.
 8 April 2008: A Vietnam People's Air Force An-26 crashed in a field in the Thanh Trì district, killing all five on board.

2010s
 18 March 2010: An Exin An-26B (SP-FDO) made an emergency landing on the Lake Ülemiste, close to Lennart Meri Tallinn Airport. None of the six crew members was injured. Initial reports indicated failure of one of the turboprop power plants.
 25 August 2010: An Exin An-26B (SP-FDP) rejected takeoff from Tallinn's runway 08 at high speed when the gear collapsed or retracted during the takeoff roll on  2010. The airplane skidded to a stop on its belly, no injuries occurred.
 6 June 2011: Solenta Aviation Flight 122A, an An-26 (TR-LII), crashed in the sea near Libreville, Gabon, during an attempted go-around following hydraulic problems. Four people on board were rescued and transported to a local hospital, but were not seriously injured. The aircraft was operating on behalf of DHL.
 24 November 2011: A Yemeni Air Force An-26 crashed outside Sanaa due to technical problems. 15 crew members and passengers died.
 21 November 2012: a Yemeni Air Force An-26 crashed close to Sanaa International Airport, killing all 10 people on board.
 19 August 2012: An Alfa Airlines An-26-100 (ST-ARL) struck a mountain during its second approach to the Talodi airfield in South Kordofan, Sudan. All 26 passengers on board and six crew members died.
 21 February 2014: A Libyan Air Cargo An-26 (5A-DOW), operating an ambulance flight, crashed in a farm near Grombalia, 60 km short of Tunis-Carthage Airport, after one of its engines caught fire. The accident resulted in the death of all its 11 occupants: six crew members, two doctors and three patients.
(confirmed to be shot using Buk missile system). U.S. officials would later say evidence suggested the aircraft had been fired on from inside Russian territory
 18 January 2015: Syrian Air Force An-26 YK-AND crashed while attempting to land at the besieged Abu al-Duhur military airport in Idlib Governorate, Syria, killing all 30 on board.
 9 March 2016: A True Aviation An-26B (S2-AGZ) crashed into the Bay of Bengal near Cox's Bazar while attempting to return to Cox's Bazar Airport following an engine failure, klling three of four on board.
 30 April 2016: A Sudan Air Force An-26 crashed during a landing attempt at Al-Ubayyid. All five crew members died.
 20 March 2017: A South Supreme Airlines An-26B (S9-TLZ) was destroyed by fire after crashing at Wau Airport, South Sudan, after the left landing gear struck a fire truck during landing; all 45 on board survived.
 29 April 2017: Aerogaviota Flight FAR1436, an An-26 (CU-T1406), crashed in the Loma de la Pimienta Mountains near Las Terrazas, Cuba, killing all eight on board. The aircraft was operating on behalf of the Cuban Air Force.
 30 May 2017: Russian Air Force An-26 RF-36160 crashed at Balashov Airfield during a training flight after descending too soon, killing one of six on board.
 28 August 2017: A Coco Aviation An-26B (EK-26006) overran the runway at Maban Airstrip and was destroyed by the consequent fire. The crew survived.
 14 October 2017: A Valan Air An-26 (ER-AVB) chartered by the French Military crashed shortly before landing at Abidjan, the Ivory Coast capital. Four people were killed and six were injured.
 6 March 2018: Russian Air Force An-26 RF-92955 crashed at Khmeimim Air Base. All 33 passengers and six crew died in the incident.
 20 December 2018: A Gomair An-26 (9S-AGB) crashed 19 nautical miles short of Kinshasa with 7 or 8 people on board. The aircraft was found more than 24 hours later by a local. The aircraft was carrying election materials on behalf of the Central Electoral National Independent Commission (CENI).
 24 December 2018: Congolese Air Force An-26 9T-TAB crashed as it overshot the runway at Beni Airport in North Kivu province. The aircraft was reportedly transporting troops, and the crash resulted in 38 people being taken to hospital.

2020s
 22 August 2020: A South West Aviation An-26 (EX-126) lost power during take-off at Juba Airport and crashed into Hai Referendum residential area on the outskirts of the airport. Out of the 9 occupants on board, 8 crew members were killed alongside 9 others on the ground.
 25 September 2020: Ukraine Air Force An-26 76 yellow with cadets of the Ivan Kozhedub National Air Force University crashed and immediately caught fire in Ukraine's Kharkiv Oblast. There were 27 people on board; 25 were killed immediately and one died in hospital; the sole survivor was seriously injured.
 13 March 2021: Kazakh Border Guards An-26 crashed short of the runway while attempting to land at Almaty Airport. Two of the six occupants survived.
 6 July 2021: A Petropavlovsk-Kamchatsky Air An-26, crashed on a cliff in the vicinity of Palana, killing all 22 passengers and six crew members. Most of the debris slid down into the Okhotsk Sea.
 22 September 2021: a technical flight that disappeared from flight radars 38 km from Khabarovsk crashed, killing all six members of the crew.
 2 November 2021: Optimum Aviation Antonov An-26, registered as TR-NGT, crashed near the White Nile just after take-off from Juba International Airport, South Sudan. All five crew were killed.
24 February 2022: 2022 Russian invasion of Ukraine: Ukrainian Air Force An-26 59 blue was shot down near Zhukivtsi by Russian fire. Five of the fourteen people on board were killed.
24 February 2022: Russian Air Force An-26 RF-36074 crashed near Voronezh. All crew reported dead.
27 February 2022: An Antonov Airlines An-26-100 (UR-13395) was confirmed to be destroyed in Hostomel, Kyiv during the attack.
22 April 2022: A Constanta Airlines An-26B-100 (UR-UZB) crashed after it struck power lines over Mykhailivka in the Zaporizhzhia Oblast, killing one of three crew.

Aircraft on display

 Germany
 An-26, tail number "52+04", former East German "375", is exhibited at Technikmuseum Speyer
 An-26, tail number "52+05", former East German "376" is exhibited at Schwäbisches Bauern- und Technik-Museum, Eschach-Seifertshofen
 An-26, tail number "52+08", former East German "368" is exhibited at Flugausstellung Hermeskeil
 An-26SM, tail number "52+09", former East German "369", is exhibited at Militärhistorisches Museum Flugplatz Berlin-Gatow
Poland
 An-26, tail number "1509" is exhibited in the Polish Aviation Museum in Kraków

An-26, tail number "1602" is exhibited in the Polish Army Museum in Warsaw.
 Lithuania
 An-26B, civilian tail number "16444", military tail number "06", former Aeroflot, from 1991 - Lithuanian Airlines, afterwards - Lithuanian Air Force, exhibited at Lithuanian Aviation Museum, S. Darius and S. Girėnas (Aleksotas) airfield (EYKS), Kaunas.
 Pakistan
 A2-26, Afghan Air Force, is exhibited at PAF Museum, Karachi
Russia
 An-26 is displayed in Balashov town
 An-26, tail number RA-26610, is displayed in place of former Nadezhda airport, in Norilsk.
 An-26, tail number CCCP-26608, is displayed at the entrance to Salekhard airport (SLY / USDD).
 Ukraine
 An-26, tail number UR-26194, is exhibited on the street side at Prospekt Komarova 1, in front of National Aviation University in Kyiv.

Specifications

See also

References

Citations

Bibliography
 Chant, Christopher. Commercial Aircraft and Airline Markings

External links

 Pictures of An-26 at Airliners.net
 https://web.archive.org/web/20061023125914/http://www.antonov.com/about/an-26.xml
 https://web.archive.org/web/20061103104838/http://www.aeronautics.ru/an26a.jpg
 http://rus.air.ru/airplanes/images/An-26pict.htm
 http://www.transportflieger.eu
 http://www.luroko.de
 Details of An-26 at EnglishRussia.com

AN-026
Antonov AN-026
Antonov AN-026
High-wing aircraft
Aircraft first flown in 1969
Twin-turboprop tractor aircraft